Barnum is an unincorporated community and coal town in Mineral County, West Virginia, United States. It is part of the Cumberland, MD-WV Metropolitan Statistical Area. Barnum lies on the North Branch Potomac River along a line of the Western Maryland Railroad no longer in operation. Barnum has excellent trout fishing along its banks and offers many opportunities for anglers.

Barnum is located downstream from Jennings Randolph lake which is situated between West Virginia and Maryland on the North Branch of the Potomac River.

The community has the name of William H. Barnum, a railroad official.

Notable person 
Charles Irving Elliott, pioneer aviator

References 

Unincorporated communities in Mineral County, West Virginia
Unincorporated communities in West Virginia
Coal towns in West Virginia
Populated places on the North Branch Potomac River